Olympic Club Muungano  is a Congolese football club based in Bukavu, South Kivu province and currently playing in Linafoot Ligue 2. 

Les Blanc et Bleu plays its home matches on Stade de la Concorde in Bukavu, with a capacity of 10,000 places.

Achievements
Sud-Kivu Provincial League: 2
 2003, 2006

References

External links

Muungano club logo

Bukavu
Football clubs in the Democratic Republic of the Congo
Sports clubs in the Democratic Republic of the Congo